The 1952 Belgian Grand Prix was a Formula Two race held on 22 June 1952 at Circuit de Spa-Francorchamps. It was race 3 of 8 in the 1952 World Championship of Drivers, in which each Grand Prix was run to Formula Two rules rather than the Formula One regulations normally used.

Report
Maserati's new A6GCM was still not ready, and, to compound this, their lead driver Juan Manuel Fangio had suffered back injuries at the non-championship Monza Grand Prix. This meant that Ferrari were once again favoured for success in the race, with their driver lineup consisting of Alberto Ascari (in place of André Simon), Nino Farina and Piero Taruffi. There were also two privateer Ferrari entries: local driver Charles de Tornaco of Ecurie Francorchamps, and Louis Rosier. The Gordini team expanded their lineup to include Belgian driver Johnny Claes, alongside Behra, Manzon and Bira. American Robert O'Brien also drove a Simca-Gordini for this race. HWM also recruited a pair of Belgian drivers — Paul Frère and Roger Laurent — who raced alongside regular drivers Peter Collins and Lance Macklin. Stirling Moss switched from HWM to ERA for this race. A handful of other privateer entrants also took part, including future World Champion Mike Hawthorn, who made his debut in a Cooper-Bristol.

Ascari headed an all-Ferrari front row, with teammates Farina and Taruffi in second and third, respectively. The Gordinis of Manzon and Behra made up row two, while the third row consisted of Hawthorn, Ken Wharton (in a Frazer-Nash), and Frère, who was the highest qualifier of the five Belgian drivers on the grid.

Taruffi started badly in the rain, dropping to ninth by the end of the first lap, while Behra overhauled the two leading Ferraris to take the lead of the race. Moss also started well, before his car broke down halfway through the first lap. Behra's lead was short-lived, as both Ascari and Farina overtook him on the second lap, subsequently holding first and second for the remainder of the race. Behra dropped to fourth when the recovering Taruffi passed him on lap 13. On the following lap Taruffi spun at Malmédy and Behra hit him, causing both to retire. Manzon overtook Hawthorn to assume what was now third place. Despite suffering from fuel leakage problems, Hawthorn was able to maintain fourth place until the end of the race. His fellow debutant Paul Frère also finished in the points, in fifth.

Ascari's win (with fastest lap), and Taruffi's retirement, meant that the two now shared the lead of the Championship, on nine points each. Indianapolis 500 winner Troy Ruttman was in third, while Farina's second-place finish raised him to fourth in the standings, three points adrift of the joint Championship leaders.

Entries

Classification

Qualifying

Race

Notes
 – Includes 1 point for fastest lap

Championship standings after the race 
Drivers' Championship standings

Note: Only the top five positions are included. Only the best 4 results counted towards the Championship.

References

Belgian Grand Prix
Belgian Grand Prix
Grand Prix
European Grand Prix
Belgian Grand Prix